Shakuntala (Sanskrit: Śakuntalā, Tibetan: བྱ་ལེན་མའི་ཟློ་གར) is the wife of Dushyanta and the mother of Emperor Bharata. Her story is told in the Adi Parva of the ancient Indian epic Mahabharata and dramatized by many writers, the most famous adaption being Kalidasa's play Abhijñānaśākuntala (The Sign of Shakuntala).

Mythology
There are two different stories of Shakuntala's life. The first version is the one described in Mahabharata, one of the two major Hindu epics traditionally attributed to the sage Vyasa. This story had been adapted as the play by the 4th-5th century CE poet Kalidasa.

Birth
Once, Vishvamitra started to meditate to earn the status of a Brahmarshi. The intensity of his penance frightened Indra. He feared that Vishvamitra might want his throne. To end his penance, Indra sent Menaka, an apsara, to lure him and bring him out of his penance. Menaka reached Vishwamitra's meditating spot and started to seduce him. Vishvamitra could not control his lust and desire and his penance was broken. Vishvamitra and Menaka lived together for a few years and a daughter was born to them. Later, Vishvamitra realized that all those things were Indra's tricks. He realized that he needed to control his emotions. Vishvamitra left Menaka and Menaka left the baby near Rishi Kanva's hermitage before returning to heaven.

Upbringing
Rishi Kanva found two babies in his hermitage surrounded by Shakunta birds (śakunta). Therefore, he named the baby girl Shakuntala, meaning Shakunta-protected.

In the Adi Parva of Mahabharata, Kanva says:
She was surrounded in the solitude of the wilderness by śakuntas,
therefore, hath she been named by me Shakuntala (Shakunta-protected).

And he named the baby boy Pramati; later Pramati became an acharya himself.

Marriage with Dushyanta
King Dushyanta first encountered Shakuntala while travelling through the forest with his army. He was pursuing a male deer wounded by his weapon. Shakuntala and Dushyanta fell in love with each other and got married as per the Gandharva marriage system. Before returning to his kingdom, Dushyanta gave his personal royal ring to Shakuntala as a symbol of his promise to his wife to bring her to his palace as queen.

Durvasa's curse 

Shakuntala spent much time dreaming of her new husband and was often distracted by her daydreams. One day, a powerful rishi, Durvasa, came to the ashrama but, lost in her thoughts about Dushyanta, Shakuntala failed to greet him properly. Incensed by this slight, the rishi cursed Shakuntala, saying that the person she was dreaming of would forget about her altogether. As he departed in a rage, one of Shakuntala's friends quickly explained to him the reason for her friend's distraction. The rishi, realizing that his extreme wrath was not justified, modified his curse saying that the person who had forgotten Shakuntala would remember everything again if she showed him a personal token that had been given to her.

Journey to Hastinapura
Time passed, and Shakuntala, wondering why Dushyanta did not return for her, finally set out for the capital city with her foster father and some of her companions. On the way, they had to cross a river by a canoe ferry and, seduced by the deep blue waters of the river, Shakuntala ran her fingers through the water. Her ring (Dushyanta's ring) slipped off her finger without her realizing it.

Arriving at Dushyanta's court, Shakuntala was hurt and surprised when her husband did not recognize her, nor recollected anything about her. She tried to remind him that she was his wife but without the ring, Dushyanta did not recognize her. Humiliated, she returned to the forests and, collecting her son, settled in a wild part of the forest by herself. Here she spent her days while Bharata, her son, grew older. Surrounded only by wild animals, Bharata grew to be a strong youth and made a sport of opening the mouths of tigers and lions and counting their teeth.

Reunion with Dushyanta

Meanwhile, a fisherman was surprised to find a royal ring in the belly of a fish he had caught. Recognizing the royal seal, he took the ring to the palace and, upon seeing his ring, Dushyanta's memories of his lovely bride came rushing back to him. He immediately set out to find her and, arriving at her father's ashram, discovered that she was no longer there. He continued deeper into the forest to find his wife and came upon a surprising scene in the forest: a young boy had pried open the mouth of a lion and was busy counting its teeth. The king greeted the boy, amazed by his boldness and strength, and asked his name. He was surprised when the boy answered that he was Bharata, the son of King Dushyanta. The boy took him to Shakuntala, and thus the family was reunited.

Variants
An alternate narrative is that after Dushyanta failed to recognize Shakuntala, her mother Menaka took Shakuntala to Heaven where she gave birth to Bharata. Dushyanta was required to fight at the side of the devas, from which he emerged victoriously; his reward was to be reunited with his wife and son. He had a vision in which he saw a young boy counting the teeth of a lion. His kavacha (armband/armour) had fallen off his arm. Dushyanta was informed by the devas that only Bharata's mother or father could tie it back on his arm. Dushyanta successfully tied it on his arm. The confused Bharata took the king to his mother Shakuntala and told her that this man claimed to be his father. Upon which Shakuntala told Bharata that the king was indeed his father. Thus the family was reunited in Heaven, and they returned to earth to rule for many years before the birth of the Pandava.

In popular culture

Theatre, literature and music

Kalidasa

The Recognition of Sakuntala is a Sanskrit play written by Kalidasa.

On the Marathi stage, there was a musical drama titled Shakuntal based on the same story.

Opera

Sakuntala is an incomplete opera by Franz Schubert, which was started in October 1820.   Italian Franco Alfano composed an opera named La leggenda di Sakùntala (The legend of Shakuntala) in its first version (1921)  and simply Sakùntala in its second version (1952).

Ballet
 Ernest Reyer (1823–1909) composed a ballet Sacountala on a work by Théophile Gautier in 1838.  
 The Soviet composer Sergey Balasanian (1902–1982) composed a ballet named Shakuntala (premiere 28 December 1963, Riga).

Other literature
Ishwar Chandra Vidyasagar created a novel in Sadhu bhasha, Bengali. It was among the first translations from Bengali. Abanindranath Tagore later wrote in the Chalit Bhasa (which is a simpler literary variation of Bengali) mainly for children and preteens.

By the 18th century, Western poets were beginning to get acquainted with works of Indian literature and philosophy.  The German poet Goethe read Kalidasa's play and has expressed his admiration for the work in the following verses:

In 1808 Friedrich Schlegel published a German translation of the Shakuntala story from the Mahabharata.

Film and TV
A significant number of Indian films have been made on the story of Shakuntala. These include: Shakuntala (1920) by Suchet Singh, Shakuntala (1920) by S. N. Patankar, Shakuntala (1929) by Fatma Begum, Shakuntala (1931) by Mohan Dayaram Bhavnani, Shakuntala (1931) by J.J. Madan, Shakuntala (1932) by Sarvottam Badami, Shakuntala (1932), Shakuntala (1940) by Ellis Dungan, Shakuntala (1941) by Jyotish Bannerjee, Shakuntala (1943) by V. Shantaram, Shakuntala (1961) by Bhupen Hazarika, Shakuntala (1965) by Kunchacko, Shakuntala (1966) by Kamalakara Kameswara Rao, Stree by V. Shantaram.

The 2009 Indian television show, Shakuntala, was an adaptation of the play by Kalidasa.

Art
Camille Claudel created a sculpture Shakuntala.

References

Sources
 Dorothy Matilda Figueira. Translating the Orient: The Reception of Sakuntala in Nineteenth-Century Europe. SUNY Press, 1991. 
 Romila Thapar. Sakuntala: Texts, Readings, Histories. Columbia University Press, 2011. 
 Vyasa. Mahabharata.

External links

Characters in the Mahabharata
Characters in Hindu mythology